The Children Act 1908, also known as the Children and Young Persons Act 1908, passed by the Liberal government, as part of the British Liberal Party's liberal reforms package. The Act was informally known as the Children's Charter and largely superseded the Industrial Schools Act 1868.

It established juvenile courts and introduced the registration of foster parents, thus regulating baby-farming and wet-nursing and trying to stamp out infanticide.  Local authorities were also granted powers to keep poor children out of the poorhouse/workhouse and protect them from abuse.  The act also prohibited children, under the age of 16, working in dangerous trades, purchasing cigarettes, entering brothels, or the bars of trading pubs. Additionally it prohibited the consumption of alcohol, for non medicinal purposes, before the age of five. The act also prohibited children from learning criminal "tricks of the trade" in adult prisons, where children were often sent to serve time if a crime had been committed. Instead the Children's Charter had allocated Borstals. It eventually led to many councils setting up social services and orphanages.

References

External links

Juvenile law
United Kingdom Acts of Parliament 1908
Children's rights in the United Kingdom
Youth in the United Kingdom
Wet nursing